The Pledge is a term used in the U.S. state of New Hampshire for a promise by politicians not to support income taxes or sales taxes or other forms of what are known as "broad-based taxes." It has long been an important part of state politics, dating back to the 1950s, although it only become prominent in the 1970s.

Advocates describe it as an important tool in New Hampshire's budgetary process, an embodiment of the state's tradition of frugality and local control. Opponents say it creates a lop-sided and unfair tax structure, overly dependent on property taxes on individuals.

References 

Politics of New Hampshire
Taxation in New Hampshire